Benny Daniel (born 1971), better known by his penname Benyamin, is an Indian writer in Malayalam from Kerala. He is the author of about thirty books in various genres – from short stories to novels and memoirs. For his novel Goat Days (Aadujeevitham), he won the Abu Dhabi Sakthi Award, Kerala Sahitya Akademi Award and JCB Prize, and was shortlisted for the Man Asian Literary Prize. The novel Manthalirile 20 Communist Varshangal won the Vayalar Award in 2021.

Life and career 
Benyamin was born in 1971 in Njettoor, Kulanada, near Pandalam of the south Indian state of Kerala. He lived in the Kingdom of Bahrain from 1992 to 2013, before returning to Kerala. 

Goat Days (Aadujeevitham), his most famous novel, portrays the life of an Indian labourer in Saudi Arabia. It is used as a textbook at Kerala University, Calicut University, Bharathiar University, Pondicherry University and 10th standard for Kerala State syllabus.

Jasmine Days (Mullappoo Niramulla Pakalukal) tells the story of a young woman Sameera Parvin who moves to a middle eastern city and finds herself in the middle of a revolution. It revolves around the Jasmine Revolution that sprang up in December 2010 and was quelled by January 2011. The English translation of the novel won the inaugural JCB Prize for Literature, the richest literary award in the country. The jury chairperson Vivek Shanbag called the novel "brilliant and intense."

Tharakans Grandhavari (The Chronicles of Tharakan) is a unique experiment in narrative style as well as in production and publication. The plot revolves around the life of Mathu Tharakan and is narrated through 120 incidents. The book is published as 120 loose cards and the readers are given the choice to dictate the narrative. Each copy of the book is uniquely assembled such that each copy is a distinct permutation of the many possibilities in which the novel could be read. 

In 2023, Benyamin co-wrote the Malayalam film Christy with writer G. R. Indugopan, which marked his debut as a screenwriter. He also played a small character in the film.

Awards and honours
 2008 Abu Dhabi Sakthi Award (Novel), Winner, Aadujeevitham
 2009 Kerala Sahitya Akademi Award for Novel, Winner, Aadujeevitham
 2012 Man Asian Literary Prize, Longlist, Goat Days 
2013 DSC Prize for South Asian Literature, Shortlist, Goat Days
 2015 Padmaprabha Literary Award
 2018 JCB Prize for Literature, Winner, Jasmine Days
 2018 Crossword Book Award for Indian language translation, Winner, Jasmine Days
 2019 Muttathu Varkey Award
 2021 Vayalar Award, Manthalirile 20 Communist Varshangal

Bibliography

Translations in English

Filmography

References

External links

Excerpts from the book Ethoru Manushyanteyum Jeevitham. Mathrubhumi Books (in Malayalam)

1971 births
Novelists from Kerala
People from Pathanamthitta district
Living people
21st-century Indian novelists
Indian male novelists
Indian male short story writers
Malayalam novelists
21st-century Indian short story writers
21st-century Indian male writers
Recipients of the Abu Dhabi Sakthi Award